Guido Volpi (born 22 August 1995) is an Argentine rugby union footballer who plays for the Zebre Parma as a Number 8.

Volpi made his debut for the Ospreys in 2018, having previously played for espoirs team of Narbonne, in 2017−2018 season, and the Ospreys Development team. He made his Pro14 debut on 14 September 2018 against the Munster.
He played for Doncaster Knights, on loan from Ospreys two times: from January 2020 to the end of the season 2019−2020 and from December 2020 to the end of 2020−2021 season. In May 2021 he signed a one year contract with Doncaster Knights.

References

External links 
Ospreys Player Profile
It's Rugby England Profile

Ospreys (rugby union) players
Living people
1995 births
RC Narbonne players
Doncaster Knights players
Rugby union number eights
Zebre Parma players